Shane S. Dikolli (Ph.D.) is an Associate Professor of Accounting at University of Virginia's Darden School of Business. He was ranked 4th overall and 1st in accounting in Bloomberg Businessweek Most Popular Business School Professors Among Top 30 Business Schools Rankings.  Dikolli was also named Professor of the Week by the Financial Times in August 2011.

Dikolli is well known in the academic world for his research on the performance evaluation of CEOs. He was awarded the Glen McLaughlin Prize for Research in Accounting Ethics and the 2011 Journal of Management Accounting Research Best Paper Award. Professor Dikolli currently holds editorial board membership positions at The Accounting Review, Accounting, Organizations and Society, Contemporary Accounting Research, Journal of Management Accounting Research, and Accounting and Finance.

Background 
Dikolli completed his Bachelor of Business in 1986 from Curtin University of Technology in Perth, Western Australia. As a university student, he worked as a Staff Accountant for Hendry, Rae & Court, Chartered Accountants. Dikolli was appointed tenured lecturer in September 1988 at the Curtin University of Technology. Dikolli also became a consultant in the Division of Management Consulting for KPMG International Headquarters from 1991 to 1992. Dikolli completed his Postgraduate Diploma in Business (Accounting) from Curtin University of Technology in 1994. He then completed his Doctor of Philosophy (Accounting) in 1998 from the University of Waterloo in Waterloo, Canada.

In 2000, Dikolli accepted the position of an assistant professor at the University of Texas.  After 6 years at the University of Texas and 12 years at the Fuqua School of Business at Duke University, Dikolli moved on to become Associate Professor of Accounting at the University of Virginia’s Darden School of Business. Professor Dikolli teaches an MBA course on managerial accounting in the Full-Time and Weekend Executive Programs at the Darden School of Business.

Dikolli is the cousin of Australian musician Adem K (Kerimofski).

Publications 
Dikolli has published his research in the Journal of Accounting Research, Journal of Accounting and Economics, The Accounting Review, Contemporary Accounting Research, Review of Accounting Studies, European Accounting Review, Journal of Services Marketing, Behavioural Research in Accounting, Asian Review of Accounting, and Managerial Auditing Journal.
His publications include:
 Dikolli, S.S. (2001) "Agent Employment Horizons and the Contracting Demand for Forward‐looking Performance Measures," Journal of Accounting Research. 39(3): 467‐480.
 Dikolli, S.S. and I. Vaysman, (2006) "Contracting on the Stock Price and Forward Looking Performance Measures," European Accounting Review, 15 (4): 445‐464.
 Dikolli, S.S., S.L. Kulp, and K.L. Sedatole (2009) "Transient Institutional Investors and CEO Contracting," The Accounting Review, 84(3): 737‐770.
  Dikolli, S.S., C. Hofmann, and S.L. Kulp, (2009) "Interrelated Performance Measures, Interactive Effort, and Incentive Weights," Journal of Management Accounting Research, 21: 125‐149.
 Dikolli, S.S., S.A. McCracken, and J.B. Walawski, (2004) "Audit Planning Judgments and Client‐Employee Compensation Contracts," Behavioral Research in Accounting. 16: 45‐62.
  Dikolli, S.S., W.R. Kinney, Jr., and K.L. Sedatole, (2007) "Measuring Customer Relationship Value: The Role of Switching Cost" Contemporary Accounting Research, 24(1): 93‐132.
 Dikolli, S.S. and K.L. Sedatole (2007) "Improvements in the Information Content of Non‐financial Forward‐looking Performance Measures: A Taxonomy and Empirical Application," Journal of Management Accounting Research, 19: 71‐104.
 Bansal, H.S., G. McDougall, S.S. Dikolli, and K.L. Sedatole, (2004) "Relating E‐satisfaction to Behavioral Outcomes: An Empirical Study," Journal of Services Marketing. 18(4): 290‐303.
 Autrey, R.L., S.S. Dikolli, and D. P. Newman, (2007) "Career Concerns and Mandated Disclosure" Journal of Accounting and Public Policy, September/October, 26(5): 527‐554.
 Autrey, R.L., S.S. Dikolli, and D. P. Newman, (2010) "Performance Measure Aggregation, Career Incentives, and Explicit Incentives," Journal of Management Accounting Research, 22(1): 115‐131.

Honours and awards 
 Glen McLaughlin Prize for Research in Accounting Ethics, 2012/13, with Bill Mayew & Thomas Steffen.
 Best Paper Award, Journal of Management Accounting Research 2009‐2011, With Christian Hofmann & Susan Kulp.
 Bloomberg Businessweek Most Popular Business School Professors Among Top 30 Business Schools (ranked 4th overall and 1st in Accounting; August, 2011; http://buswk.co/pquVSx).
 Financial Times, "Professor of the Week," 14 October 2011.
 Nominated for The Economist Intelligence Unit "Business Professor of the Year Award," (221 professors worldwide nominated across all business disciplines and schools, 2012.
 DaimlerChrysler Award for Innovation & Excellence in Core Course Teaching, Full-time MBA (2007).
 Excellence in Teaching Award (Core Course), Weekend Executive MBA Program, (2008).
 DaimlerChrysler Award for Innovation & Excellence in Elective Course Teaching, Full-time MBA (2009, 2010, 2011, 2012)
 Excellence in Teaching Award (Core Course), Weekend Executive MBA Program, (2011).

Media Mentions 
 Bloomberg Businessweek ‐ "Muddy Olam call spurred by rule seen as ambiguous," 26 November 2012
 Bloomberg Businessweek – "Best B‐School Road Trip: Fuqua School of Business," 15 November 2012
 In The Black (Australia) – "Shane Dikolli CPA," by Aeve Baldwin, 17 September 2012
 Triangle Business Journal – " ‘Clawbacks’ on deck next for public concerns," by C. Bagley, 25 May 2012
 The Bottom Line (Canada) – "Rival Group Worries Bar Set Too Low,"by J. Grinstein, March 2012.
 Financial Times – FT Lexicon, Five Key Terms Defined: October, 2011
 Financial Times – "Something For the Weekend," 9 September 2011
 PRNewswire – "CEOs with Less Tenure Far More Likely to be Fired for Poor Performance Than Longer‐Term Counterparts," 6 September 2011
 Wall Street Journal – "New CEO? Watch Out," 6 September 2011
 Bloomberg Businessweek – "Most Popular Profs at Top Business Schools," August, 2011
 Bloomberg Businessweek – "The Five Best B‐School Profs You’ve Never Heard Of," Popularity Issue, August 2011
 Financial Times –Ten Questions, Melissa Bates: 28 June 2011

References 

Year of birth missing (living people)
Living people
Australian accountants
Curtin University alumni
Academic staff of Curtin University
Duke University faculty
University of Texas faculty
University of Waterloo alumni